Elizabeth Lincoln Gould (died December 11, 1914) was an American author of children's books and a playwright. She wrote a pair of plays based on the novels Little Women and Little Men by Louisa May Alcott.

Gould grew up in Boston. Her father was a publisher and bookseller. Numerous editions of her books were published.

She wrote children's books. She also composed song lyrics.

The New York Historical Society Museum & Gallery has a miniature watercolor on ivory painting of Gould by Laura Coombs Hills.

Her book Cap'n Gid is about a retired ship's captain who decides to shift from his rural retreat to city life for some new experiences.

Bibliography
Little Polly Prentiss Series (1903)
Little Polly Prentiss
Polly Prentiss Goes to School
Polly Prentiss Goes A-Visiting
Polly Prentiss Keeps a Promise
A Rose of Holly Court (1903)

Songs for Tom, Dick, Bob, & Peggy (1905)
Tales of the Admiral's Granddaughter Series
The Admiral's Granddaughter (1907), illustrated by Wuanita Smith
The Admiral's Little Housekeeper (1910), illustrated by Wuanita Smith, about the Beaumont family Christmas
The Admiral's Little Secretary (1911), illustrated by Wuanita Smith
The Admiral's Little Companion (1912)
Felicia Series
Felicia
Felicia's Friends
Felicia Visits
Felicia's Folks
Grandma (1911)
Cap'n Gid (1916)
Out of Doors
Happy days on the farm
Farm Holidays
Little Women (play) illustrated by Reginald B. Birch based on Louise Alcott novel
Litte Men (play) based on Alcott novel

References

Externternal links

20th-century American women writers
American women dramatists and playwrights

Year of birth missing
1914 deaths
American lyricists
Writers from Boston
American women children's writers
American children's writers